The Alfred Dunhill Masters was a golf tournament held from 1994 to 1996. The first two events were in Indonesia and the final event was in Hong Kong. It was always part of the Australasian Tour but co-sanctioned with the Asian Tour in 1996.

In 1994 it was played at the Bali Golf and Country Club, Nusa Dua, Bali, Indonesia; in 1995 it was played at the Emeralda Golf and Country Club, Jakarta, Indonesia; and in 1996 it was played at the Royal Hong Kong Golf Club. The prize money was A$350,000 in 1994, US$400,000 in 1995 and US$500,000 in 1996.

The 1994 event received a decent amount of media attention for the "dramatic disqualification" of leader Nick Faldo. Faldo held a six stroke lead on the 12th hole of the final round. He was then notified that he unknowingly broke a rule the previous day, removing a piece of coral from a bunker. He was immediately disqualified paving the way for playing partner Jack Kay Jr. to win the event.

Winners

Notes

References

Former PGA Tour of Australasia events
Former Asian Tour events
Golf tournaments in Indonesia
Golf tournaments in Hong Kong
Recurring sporting events established in 1994
Recurring sporting events disestablished in 1996
1994 establishments in Indonesia
1996 disestablishments in Hong Kong